Acanthomyrmex notabilis is a species of ant which is a part of the genus Acanthomyrmex. Frederick Smith first described the species in 1860, and it is native to Indonesia.

References

notabilis
Insects described in 1860
Insects of Indonesia